AZE may refer to:

 Alliance for Zero Extinction
 AZE notation for isotopes:  where A is the mass number, Z the atomic number, and E the element's chemical symbol.
 Azerbaijan using ISO 3166-1 alpha-3 country code
 Azerbaijani language (ISO 639 alpha-3, aze)
 German car number plate for Anhalt-Zerbst
 Azetidine-2-carboxylic acid

See also 
 Azé (disambiguation)